U.S. Route 79 (US 79) is a U.S. highway that begins in the state of Texas at Interstate 35 in Round Rock. The highway travels northeast–southwest through the state, crossing into Louisiana approximately 23 miles northeast of Carthage. US 79 is entwined with two tragedies of country music: Johnny Horton was killed by a drunk driver on the highway near Milano in 1960 and Jim Reeves, killed in a plane crash in 1964, is buried and memorialized on US 79 in his hometown of Carthage.

Route description

US 79 begins at an interchange with Interstate 35 in the Austin suburb of Round Rock. The highway travels through the town as Palm Valley Boulevard, entering into the town of Hutto just before an interchange with State Highway 130. Leaving Hutto, US 79 takes a more rural route, bypassing the town of Taylor and enters Milam County right before entering the small community of Thorndale. US 79 runs through the town of Rockdale before entering Milano, where it begins an overlap with U.S. Route 190 and a brief concurrency with State Highway 36. The overlap with US 190 ends in Hearne, where an overlap with State Highway 6 begins. US 79 leaves State Highway 6, resuming its northeast–southwest run. The highway runs through several smaller towns, including Franklin and Buffalo, and begins an overlap with US 84 approximately 9 miles southwest of Palestine. Running through the city, the highway intersects US Route 287 and shares a brief overlap with State Highway 19. Leaving Palestine, US 79 travels through a heavily forested area of east Texas serving the towns of Jacksonville and Henderson. Leaving Henderson, the highway runs in an east–west direction before arriving at Carthage, turning back into a more northeast–southwest direction. About 23 miles northeast of Carthage US 79 leaves Texas and enters into Louisiana, running towards Shreveport.

Junction list

See also

References

External links

 Texas
Transportation in Williamson County, Texas
Transportation in Milam County, Texas
Transportation in Robertson County, Texas
Transportation in Leon County, Texas
Transportation in Freestone County, Texas
Transportation in Anderson County, Texas
Transportation in Cherokee County, Texas
Transportation in Rusk County, Texas
Transportation in Panola County, Texas
79